State highway loops in Texas are owned and maintained by the Texas Department of Transportation (TxDOT).

Loop 500

Loop 500 is located in Shelby County. It runs from US 96 northwest of Center to SH 7 southwest of Center.

Loop 500 was designated on April 29, 1971, as a loop off SH 7 in Center. On August 26, 2010, the northern section was extended west 2.9 miles to US 96 northwest of Center.

Loop 505

Loop 505 is located in Newton County. It runs from SH 87 northeast of Newton to SH 87 southwest of Newton.

Loop 505 was designated on August 31, 1972, on the current route along an old routing of SH 87; the route was signed as SH 87 Business rather than Loop 505.

Loop 506

Loop 506 was located in Wise County. It is now Business US 81.

Loop 507

Loop 507 was designated on August 31, 1972, as a loop off SH 6 in Bryan-College Station. The route was signed as SH 6 Business rather than Loop 507. On June 21, 1990, Loop 507 was cancelled and transferred to Business SH 6-R.

Loop 508

Loop 508 was designated on August 31, 1972, as a loop off SH 6 in Navasota. The route was signed as SH 6 Business rather than Loop 508. On June 21, 1990, Loop 508 was cancelled and transferred to Business SH 6-S.

Loop 509

Loop 509 was designated on July 31, 1972, as a loop off SH 78 in Copeville along an old routing of SH 78. on June 21, 1990, Loop 509 was cancelled and transferred to Business SH 78-F.

Loop 512

Loop 512 was designated on November 3, 1972, as a loop off US 59 in Splendora along an old routing of US 59. The route was signed as US 59 Business rather than Loop 512. On June 21, 1990, Loop 512 was cancelled and transferred to Business US 59-L.

Loop 513

Loop 513 was designated on September 4, 1973, as a loop off SH 123 in Seguin along an old routing of SH 123. The route was signed as SH 123 Business rather than Loop 513. On June 21, 1990, Loop 513 was cancelled and transferred to Business SH 123-B.

Loop 516

Loop 516 was designated on May 31, 1973, as a loop off US 181 in Beeville along an old routing of US 181. The route was signed as US 181 Business rather than Loop 516. On June 21, 1990, Loop 516 was cancelled and transferred to Business US 181-J.

Loop 517

Loop 517 is located in Dimmit County. It runs from US 83 northeast of Carrizo Springs to US 277 northwest of Carrizo Springs.

Loop 517 was designated on June 20, 1975, on the current route.

Loop 518

Loop 518 was designated on November 25, 1975, as a loop off US 190 in Killeen along an old routing of US 190. The route was signed as US 190 Business instead of Loop 518. On June 21, 1990, Loop 518 was cancelled and transferred to Business US 190-F.

Loop 519

Loop 519 was located in Culberson County. It was the former alignment of US 80 through Van Horn. It is now Business I-10.

Loop 520

Loop 520 was designated on November 25, 1975, as a loop off SH 171 in Covington along an old routing of SH 171. On June 21, 1990, Loop 520 was cancelled and transferred to Business SH 171-E.

Loop 521

Loop 521 is located in Jackson County. It runs from US 59 east of Edna to US 59 west of Edna.

Loop 521 was designated on June 30, 1976, on the current route along an old routing of US 59.

Loop 522

Loop 522 is located in Jackson County. It runs from US 59 east of Ganado to US 59 west of Ganado.

Loop 522 was designated on June 30, 1976, on the current route along an old routing of US 59; the route was signed as US 59 Business rather than Loop 522.

Loop 523

Loop 523 is located in Wharton County. It runs from US 59, 1.3 miles west of Louise to US 59, 1.8 miles east of Louise.

Loop 523 was designated on June 21, 1979, on the current route.

Loop 524

Loop 524 is located in Wharton County. It runs from US 59 east of Hillje to US 59 west of Hillje.

Loop 524 was designated on June 30, 1976, on the current route along an old routing of US 59; the route was signed as US 59 Business rather than Loop 524.

Loop 525

Loop 525 was designated on August 23, 1976, as a loop off US 59 in El Campo along an old routing of US 59. The route was signed as US 59 Business rather than Loop 525. On April 23, 1997, Spur 525 was cancelled and transferred to Business US 59-S.

Loop 526

Loop 526 is located in Wharton County. It runs from US 59 east of Pierce to US 59 west of Pierce.

Loop 526 was designated on June 30, 1976, on the current route along an old routing of US 59.

Loop 528

Loop 528 was designated on August 23, 1976, as a loop off US 287 in Waxahachie along an old routing of US 287. The route was signed as US 287 Business rather than Loop 528. On June 21, 1990, Loop 528 was cancelled and transferred to Business US 287-R.

Loop 530

Loop 530 was designated on November 23, 1976, as a loop off US 190 in Belton along an old routing of US 190. On October 26, 2000, by district request, Loop 530 was cancelled and removed from the highway system due to the city of Belton planning utility improvements along the route.

Loop 531

Loop 531 was designated on January 20, 1977, as a loop off US 287 in Grapeland along an old routing of US 287. On July 31, 2003, Loop 531 was cancelled by district request and redesignated as Business US 287-V.

Loop 532

Loop 532 was located in Encinal. It is now Business I-35.

Loop 533

Loop 533 is located in Palo Pinto County. Both of its termini are at SH 16.

Loop 533 was designated on May 27, 1977, on the current route along an old routing of SH 16.

Loop 534

Loop 534, also known as Veterans Highway, is located in Kerr County. It runs  from SH 173 south of Kerrville north to I-10.

Loop 534 was designated on May 2, 1977, from FM 689 (now SH 173) southeast of Kerrville north to I-10. On October 23, 1978, the road was extended southeast  to SH 16, replacing a section of FM 689 (although this section was signed as SH 173). On October 2, 1990, a  section from SH 16 to the southern terminus was transferred to SH 173.

Junction list

Loop 538

Loop 538 was designated on January 24, 1978, from FM 78, 0.5 mile east of SH 218, east and northeast to FM 78 near Live Oak Road (now Schertz Parkway) in Schertz. The route was never built, and was cancelled on June 18, 1996.

Loop 539

Loop 539 was designated on January 24, 1978, from FM 78, 0.3 mile west of FM 1103, east and northeast to FM 78 near Haeckerville Road in Cibolo. On September 26, 1996, the road was rerouted along old FM 78 through Cibolo after FM 78 was rerouted south of town. On November 20, 2014, Loop 539 was cancelled and returned to the city of Cibolo.

Loop 540

Loop 540 is located in Fort Bend County. It begins northeast of Beasley at an exit ramp off southbound Future I-69/US 59, about  past the intersection with Daily Road. Initially one-way, it runs southwest alongside the Union Pacific Railroad tracks. Two-way traffic begins after . The route passes through Beasley before intersecting FM 1875 southwest of the city. Loop 540 then intersects FM 360, beyond which the road again becomes one-way before transitioning into an entrance ramp for southbound Future I-69/US 59.

Loop 540 was designated on April 14, 1980, on the current route.

Loop 541

Loop 541 is located in Fort Bend County. It begins northeast of Kendleton at an exit ramp off southbound Future I-69/US 59. It runs southwest along the Union Pacific Railroad tracks, intersecting FM 2919. Loop 541 continues to the southwest for another ; while the designation has the route connecting to the freeway here, it instead ends at a turnaround. A paved road goes a short distance past the turnaround before turning sharply to the northwest, connecting with Ben Williams Drive after crossing the railroad tracks.

Loop 541 was designated on April 14, 1980, on the current route.

Loop 543

Loop 543 is located in Fayette County. It runs from SH 71 west of West Point to SH 71 east of West Point.

Loop 543 was designated on February 7, 1983, on the current route along an old routing of SH 71.

Loop 544

Loop 544 was designated on February 23, 1983, as a loop off US 84 in Roscoe. On June 21, 1990, Loop 544 was cancelled and transferred to Business US 84-J.

Loop 545

Loop 545 was designated on April 20, 1984, from US 67 northeast 5.1 miles to Main Street, then north along Main Street 0.5 mile to US 67 along an old routing of US 67. On March 29, 1988, a 1.1 mile section from US 87 to FM 380 was removed and returned to the city of San Angelo. The remainder of Loop 545 was cancelled on November 21, 1996, and transferred to Business US 67-H.

Loop 546

Loop 546 was designated on April 9, 1984, from Loop 250 east and south 3.5 miles to Wall Avenue, then east 1.3 miles along Wall Avenue to SH 349 (now Business SH 349), then south along SH 349 to Florida Avenue, then southeast 2.5 miles along Florida Avenue and Garden City Highway to I-20/SH 158 along an old routing of SH 158. On June 21, 1990, Loop 546 was cancelled and transferred to Business SH 158-B.

Loop 547

Loop 547 is located in San Augustine County. Both of its termini are at SH 21 within the San Augustine city limits.

Loop 547 was designated on July 24, 1984, on its current route. It is a former routing of SH 21.

Loop 549

Loop 549 was designated on September 27, 1985, from SH 70, 2 miles west of Sweetwater, south 2 miles to Loop 432 (now Business I-20). The route was signed, but not designated, as SH 70. Loop 549 was cancelled on June 21, 1990, as the SH 70 designation became official.

Loop 550

Loop 550 was designated on April 18, 1985, as a loop off I-40 in Adrian along an old routing of US 66. On June 21, 1990, Loop 550 was cancelled and transferred to Business I-40-B.

Loop 551

Loop 551 was designated on April 18, 1985, as a loop off I-40 in Vega along an old routing of US 66. On June 21, 1990, Loop 551 was cancelled and transferred to Business I-40-C.

Loop 552

Loop 552 was designated on April 18, 1985, from I-40 west of Amarillo east, north, and east 9 miles to US 60/US 87, then east and northeast 10.8 miles along US 60 to its intersection with Loop 552, then southeast 4.6 miles to I-40 along an old routing of US 66. On October 25, 1990, Loop 552 was cancelled and transferred to Business I-40-D.

Loop 554

Loop 554 was designated on April 18, 1985, as a loop off I-40 in Groom along an old routing of US 66. On June 21, 1990, Loop 554 was cancelled and transferred to Business I-40-F.

Loop 555

Loop 555 was designated on April 18, 1985, as a loop off I-40 in McLean along an old routing of US 66. On June 21, 1990, Loop 555 was cancelled and transferred to Business I-40-H.

Loop 556

Loop 556 was designated on April 18, 1985, as a loop off I-40 in Shamrock along an old routing of US 66. On March 24, 1993, Loop 556 was cancelled and transferred to Business I-40-J.

Loop 558

Loop 558 was designated on January 15, 1986, from SH 35 southwest and west 4.9 miles to the intersection of SH 35 and SH 288. On February 25, 1987, the route was transferred to SH 35 and Loop 558 was reassigned to an old routing of SH 35 from SH 288 east 3.7 miles to SH 35. Loop 558 was cancelled on September 29, 1992, and transferred to FM 523.

Loop 560

Loop 560 was located in Ellis and Dallas counties. It was the former alignment of US 75 through Ferris. It is now Business I-45.

Loop 561

Loop 561 is located in Ellis County. It is the former alignment of US 75 through Trumbull. Both of its termini are at I-45.

Loop 561 was designated on January 28, 1987, on the current route.

Loop 562

Loop 562 was located in Ellis County. It was the former alignment of US 75 through Palmer. It is now Business I-45.

Loop 564

Loop 564 encircles Mineola.

Loop 564 was designated on March 25, 2010, on the current route as a replacement of FM 564.

Loop 564 (1987)

A previous route designated Loop 564 was located in Navarro County. It was the former alignment of US 75 through Corsicana. It is now Business I-45.

Loop 566

Loop 566 was designated on May 2, 1988, from US 287/SH 283, south along SH 6, then west to US 277 along an old routing of US 277. On June 21, 1990, Loop 566 was cancelled and transferred to Business US 277-G.

Loop 567

Loop 567 is located in Hood County. It runs from US 377 west of Granbury to Business US 377-H east of Granbury.

Loop 567 was designated on November 25, 1986, from US 377 west of Granbury northeast to FM 51 north of town. On May 25, 2000, by district request, the road was extended 2.25 miles east and south to Business US 377-H.

Loop 569

Loop 569 was designated on April 23, 1987, as a loop off US 380 in Decatur along an old routing of US 380. On June 21, 1990, Loop 569 was cancelled and transferred to Business US 380-F.

Loop 570

Loop 570  is located in Tom Green County. It is the former route of US 87 through Wall.

Loop 571

Loop 571 is located in Rusk County. It runs from US 259 north of Henderson to US 259 south of Henderson.

Loop 571 was designated on September 29, 1987, on the current route as a replacement of FM 454.

Loop 573

Loop 573 is located in Liberty County. It runs from US 59 north of Cleveland to US 59 south of Cleveland.

Loop 573 was designated on December 31, 1987, on the current route along an old routing of US 59.

Loop 574

Loop 574 is located in McLennan County. It runs from I-35 to Loop 484.

Loop 574 was designated on December 21, 1987, on the current route.

Loop 577

Loop 577  is located in Concho County. It is the former route of US 87 through Vick.

Loop 590

Loop 590 was designated on April 26, 1989, from US 77 south and southwest 13.9 miles along Helen Moore Road (now Paso Real Highway) to US 77/US 83 (now I-69E). On December 21, 1994, Loop 590 was cancelled and redesignated as FM 509 to provide a continuous route for FM 509.

Loop 592

Loop 592 is located in Bell County. It runs from US 190/I-14 east of Nolanville to US 190/I-14 at Paddy Hamilton Road. The route is unsigned.

Loop 592 was designated on May 24, 1990, on the current route.

Loop 593

Loop 593 was a proposed route in Hunt County. It was designated on January 29, 1991, from US 69 in Greenville south and east  to SH 34. However, the city of Greenville rejected construction of the route, and the designation was cancelled on July 15, 1992.

Loop 635

Loop 635 was located in Dallas and Tarrant counties. It was the temporary designation for the northwestern segment of I-635 from 1968 to 1974.

Loop 820

Loop 820 was located in Tarrant County. It was the temporary designation for segments of I-820 from 1963 to 1977.

Loop 1604

Loop 1604 serves as the outer highway loop of San Antonio.

Loop 1853

Loop 1853 is a proposed loop around the south side of Madisonville. The number was chosen to commemorate the year that Madison County was established.

References

+5
State highway loops 500
State highway loops 500